Alison Eastwood (born May 22, 1972) is an American actress. After three uncredited roles between 1980 and 1997, she appeared as Mandy, the love interest of John Cusack in Midnight in the Garden of Good and Evil (1997).

Early life
Eastwood was born on May 22, 1972, in Santa Monica, California, the daughter of Margaret Neville Johnson and actor-director Clint Eastwood. She has a brother, Kyle, and six known paternal half-siblings: Laurie, Kimber, Scott, Kathryn, Francesca, and Morgan.

Eastwood attended Santa Catalina School in Monterey, California, and Stevenson School in Pebble Beach. In 1990, aged 18, Eastwood enrolled at UC Santa Barbara to study acting; she did not graduate.

Career
Eastwood landed some professional acting roles during her childhood and preadolescent years, making an uncredited movie debut at the age of seven in Bronco Billy (1980). Her acting in the 1984 thriller Tightrope earned her a Young Artist Award nomination. She has also worked as a runway and magazine model in Paris, posing for several European fashion magazines and Vogue (U.S. edition). She posed nude in the February 2003 issue of Playboy.

Since then, Eastwood has again appeared onscreen. Her film credits include Midnight in the Garden of Good and Evil (1997), Just a Little Harmless Sex (1998), Black and White (1999), Friends & Lovers (1999), If You Only Knew (2000), Power Play (2002), Poolhall Junkies (2003), I'll Be Seeing You (2004), Once Fallen (2010), and The Mule (2018).

Eastwood made her directorial debut with Rails & Ties (2007), starring Kevin Bacon and Marcia Gay Harden.

She has her own clothing line, called the Eastwood Ranch Apparel. She is the founder of the Eastwood Ranch Foundation, a non-profit animal welfare organization.

On the small screen, she appeared in the Nat Geo Wild TV program Animal Intervention. She has also been featured on the reality TV series Chainsaw Gang as one of the sculptor's girlfriends. The sculptor is Stacy Poitras, whom she married on March 15, 2013.

Eastwood's cover of "Come Rain or Come Shine", which she is shown performing part of in Midnight in the Garden of Good and Evil, is included on the movie's soundtrack.

Eastwood directed the romantic drama film Battlecreek (2017), starring Bill Skarsgård, Paula Malcomson, and Claire van der Boom.

Filmography

References

External links 
 Eastwood Ranch Foundation
 

1972 births
Living people
20th-century American actresses
21st-century American actresses
Actresses from Santa Monica, California
American child actresses
American fashion designers
American women fashion designers
People from Carmel-by-the-Sea, California
American film actresses
Film producers from California
Eastwood family
University of California, Santa Barbara alumni
Film directors from California
American women film producers
Clint Eastwood